Shane Brand (born 5 August 1973)  is an Australian Paralympic wheelchair rugby player. He is quadriplegic due to a motor vehicle accident. He won a silver medal with the Australian Steelers at the 2008 Beijing Games.

References

1973 births
Paralympic wheelchair rugby players of Australia
Wheelchair rugby players at the 2008 Summer Paralympics
Paralympic silver medalists for Australia
Living people
People with tetraplegia
Medalists at the 2008 Summer Paralympics
Paralympic medalists in wheelchair rugby